The Salem Express was a passenger ship that sank in the Red Sea. It is notable due to the heavy loss of life which occurred when she sank shortly after striking a reef at around 11:13pm on Saturday December 14, 1991.

Construction
The Salem Express was a roll-on/roll-off passenger ferry which operated for 25 years, with many different owners, names and regular routes in that time.

The boat was originally named Fred Scamaroni, a member of the WW2 French resistance who was captured and tortured, killing himself in his cell without revealing his mission. Construction began in June 1963. In November 1964 it was launched and towed to Port De Borc for completion, being finally delivered in June 1965 to the Compagnie Générale Transatlantique, Marseille, France.

Its launch was delayed by a fire in the engine room on June 26, 1966. In June 1966 it began sailing its first route between Marseille – Ajaccio. In January 1967, it collided with the Ajaccio quay; and in April 1970 a fire broke out on the way to Bastia. While operating the Dunkirk - Ramsgate route in 1980, it ran aground; and on another occasion caused a traffic jam due to slow truck loading.

In 1988 it was sold to Samatour Shipping Company, Suez, Egypt, and renamed the Salem Express; its scheduled route was between Suez and Jeddah.

Final Voyage

On its final voyage, the Salem Express sailed her usual 450 mile journey from Jeddah, Saudi Arabia, to Safaga, Egypt, which took around 36 hours; they intended to unload 350 passengers, before continuing then sailing north to Suez. This route had been the ship's standard schedule since 1988. The ship's departure had been delayed by two days in Saudi Arabia due to a mechanical fault. The night of the sinking was stormy.

The majority of passengers were Egyptian. Most were poorly-paid labourers travelling home by boat for the holidays; around 150 were returning from pilgrimage to Mecca. Dives to the shipwreck confirm the "holiday" mood of the ship, with luggage packed with gifts for family members. Pilgrims returning from Mecca were dressed in fine clothes to celebrate

Cause of disaster

The ship ran aground on a coral reef between 6–10 miles off shore, after deviating from its planned route. The reef ripped a hole in the forward starboard bow, and knocked open the ship's bow door - allowing seawater into the car deck. RoRo ferries are extremely vulnerable once the car-deck is breached.

The official record in Lloyd's Marine Casualties states:
While approaching Safaga at midnight in rough weather, the Master took a short-cut which was not authorised for night passage. The ferry struck a reef and sank within 20 minutes. 

Initial reports claimed the ship had drifted off course in the high winds. This was supported by the ship's second officer, Khalid Mamdouh Ahmed, whose job it was to chart the course into the port – claiming no changes had been made. Cairo's state-owned radio quoted Samatour officials as saying the ship had veered off course in bad weather and that attempts had been made, apparently unsuccessfully, to warn it. Egyptian investigators said they had received no reports that the Salem Express deviated from its schedule.

However, an alternative belief is that the ship was deliberately taken on a different route by the captain in an attempt at a short-cut, to reduce the travel time by several hours. This was reported by Al Ahram newspaper. Captain Hassan Moro had commanded the ship since 1988 and was familiar with the waters, and was reportedly known for taking a shortcut between the Hyndman Reef and the coastline from the south, instead around the Panorama Reef from the north.
The ship's departure had been delayed due to mechanical faults in Saudi Arabia by two days. Several crew members said the captain was in a hurry, Hassan recalled, and the ship's nurse Salah said the crew was hurrying in hope of getting a full overnight stop to rest at Safaga before continuing to Suez. This is the most widely reported story in secondary sources.

As a result of the sinking, this southward course became mandatory for all big vessels.

Sinking
The ship was due to make port at 11:30pm. The crew were relaxed and did not anticipate the disaster; Captain Hassan Khalil Moro was resting in his cabin, as was his habit, with the First Officer on the bridge.

At around 11:13pm, a crash rocked the ship as it ran aground, and began shaking. Very soon after, it began listing to one side, and the lights went out. The captain sounded the distress signal. The ship was under water in close to 11 minutes, trapping hundreds below deck, and sank entirely within 20 minutes.

The speed of the sinking created panic on deck. Only one of the lifeboats was launched. Hanan Salah, a nurse on the ferry, said there was no time to help people into lifeboats; other survivors complained they had difficulty manning the lifeboats, and that some crewmembers had pushed them aside to take the boats themselves. Some crew-members descended into the ship to knock on cabin doors and rouse passengers; Shaaban abu Siriya, who left his cabin because he heard crew-members shouting, said “It just sunk all at once, and I barely had time to get out”.

The extreme weather made survival in the water more difficult. Rescue attempts on the night were not attempted due to the storm.

One survivor found a life-raft in the stormy water after four hours clinging to a wooden oar; it was filled with water and three bodies. Along with another man, she rescued 15 people onto the raft – only for it to capsize in the high waves at 7 a.m. Another man described fellow survivors clinging to the same wooden door being swept away by the waves. Ismail Abdel Hassan, an amateur long-distance swimmer who worked as an agricultural engineer, stood on the ship's deck as it sank. He followed the lights of the port and swam to shore, surviving 18 hours in the water. He attempted to lead two other men to safety, who held onto his clothes, but each died of exhaustion on the way.

Rescue and Recovery 
Due to bad weather, rescuers could not begin work until dawn on Sunday 15th, with 10 foot seas and high winds making the rescue operation challenging. Initial efforts were undertaken by four Egyptian naval ships, three air force C-130 transport planes and four helicopters, with support from U.S. and Australian navy helicopters; life rafts and lifejackets were dropped to survivors, and tourist boats also helped to rescue people from the sea. 150 people were reported rescued on Sunday, of an eventual 180 survivors, with the rescue attempt again halted overnight by weather and darkness. Search and recovery continued throughout Monday 16th.

Egyptian authorities initially intended to raise the ship. It was found to be lying on its starboard side on the sea-bed. The recovery was halted after three days as it was too dangerous to continue any deeper into the lower levels of the ship.

Victims 
On December 17, the Egyptian navy began recovery operations, supported by 23 local diving professionals and hobbyists from Hurghada and Safaga. 40 to 50 bodies were recovered on the first day. Family members gathered expectantly at the port. Victims recovered were mostly from the uppermost port side of the ship; the ferry's captain, Hassan Khalil Moro, and two other crew members were found in the bridge area, contradicting rumours he had left in a lifeboat.

Many of the deceased had been trapped within the ship as it sank. Although Islamic tradition prefers to avoid burial at sea where possible, it is permissible when there is no other option, and entryways into the ship were welded shut to prevent the bodies from being disturbed in an attempt to protect the site as a tomb.

The number of passengers and drowned are both disputed.

Early reports during the crisis struggled to pin down precise figures, with authorities giving conflicting reports:

Sedki initially announced early Sunday evening that 202 people had been rescued. Later, Egyptian television said that the prime minister had tallied 178 rescued. There was also uncertainty over the number of people aboard the ferry. The shipping company manifest reportedly listed 658 people aboard, including the 71-member crew, while the port security department in Safaga listed the total at only 589.

The official Lloyds Maritime Casualties Report claim there were 644 passengers in total - 180 survivors, 117 bodies recovered, out of 464 total victims. Another source gives the passengers as 650 persons - 578 passengers and 72 crew. A contemporary news report gives a slightly different total of 664 passengers, with 179 survivors and 485 missing at time of publication, with 71 crewmembers. The New York Times reported that only 10 out of 71 crewmembers had survived.

However, other sources claim either the death toll, or the true total of bodies recovered was 850, and that the boat had been overloaded with passengers both on deck and stood in the car deck. The original source of this speculation is unclear.

Investigation 
As well as recovering bodies, Prime Minister Atef Sedki ordered search operations to look for evidence; on the 16th, Egyptian authorities detained 7 surviving crew members in order to investigate the cause of the sinking

Diving

The wreck lies off Port Safaga, Hyndman reef, 26º39’01″N; 34º03’48″E; at a depth of 32m on sea floor, 12m to side of the wreck.

Choosing to dive at the site remains controversial in diving communities, due to the heavy loss of civilian life, the continued presence of bodies at the wreck site, how recent the wreck was, and its impact on nearby communities; the legal status is debated. Although many trips to the wreck are available, some local Dive Guides are uncomfortable with or forbid entry to the wreck, and divers often report feeling sombre or unsettled by the experience.

Others visit it as one of many wrecks in the area, seeing it as similar to visiting a historic battlefield or any other ship where there was a loss of life. Despite the reported welding over, the ship can be entered at many points, and its recent sinking means it is comparatively intact, and growing corals. It is known for its large amount of well-preserved artifacts in the debris field and within the ship, including luggage and passenger items: "rolls of carpet, portable stereos, even bicycles and pushchairs" and lifeboats on the sea bed. Some divers emphasise the importance of not interfering with the site as a way to treat it with respect, while others open suitcases and bring up souvenirs.

References

External links 
 Ferry Survivors Describe A Night of Horror, Heroism (LA Times article, 1991)
 Divers Recover Bodies of Captain And Others From Egyptian Ferry (Associated Press, New York Times, Dec. 18, 1991)
 GiddeonZeix Salem Photos Photos at the Salem Express Inside and Outside
 Red Sea Wreck Project - Detailed history of the ship
 Shipwrecks from the Egyptian Red Sea - Ned Middleton
 Passenger Vessel Evacuation Descriptions - contains official Lloyds description of the sinking, and many other similar ships
 Year-by-year history of the ship's owners and names

Shipwrecks in the Red Sea
Maritime incidents in 1991
Wreck diving sites
Maritime incidents in Egypt
1964 ships
Shipwrecks of Egypt